Bank of America Center may refer to:

 Bank of America Center (Austin, Texas)
 Bank of America Center (Baltimore), Maryland
 Bank of America Center (Houston), Texas
 Bank of America Center (Los Angeles), California
 Bank of America Center (Norfolk, Virginia)
 Bank of America Center (Orlando, Florida)
 Bank of America Center (Tulsa, Oklahoma)
 Bank of America Center (Portland, Oregon)
 Bank of America Corporate Center, Charlotte, North Carolina
 555 California Street, San Francisco, California, formerly known as the Bank of America Center
 CenturyLink Arena Boise, Boise, Idaho, formerly known as Qwest Arena and Bank of America Centre

See also
 Bank of America Building (disambiguation)
 Bank of America Plaza (disambiguation)
 Bank of America Tower (disambiguation)